

Results

Qualification

Finals

References

External links
Schedule of events at 2014 Commonwealth games-Glasgow 

Shooting at the 2014 Commonwealth Games
Common